Sebastian Zouberbuhler ( – January 31, 1773) was one of the founding fathers of Lunenburg, Nova Scotia.

Biography
Believed to have been born in Switzerland, he worked as an agent for Samuel Waldo, who speculated in land, in South Carolina and Massachusetts (including what is now the state of Maine) during the 1730s. He served in the 2nd Massachusetts Regiment in the Siege of Louisbourg (1745). Zouberbuhler traded at Louisbourg during the British occupation, moving to Halifax around 1750. In 1753, with John Creighton, he was sent by Governor Peregrine Thomas Hopson to Lunenburg. He represented Lunenburg Township in the Nova Scotia House of Assembly from 1759 to 1763. On Oct. 19, 1763, he was named to the Nova Scotia Council. Zouberbuhler was involved in the local timber trade and also speculated in land. He also served as the local magistrate. He died, probably of gout, in Lunenburg in 1773 and was buried in the crypt of St. John's Anglican Church (Lunenburg).

See also 
Dettlieb Christopher Jessen
Patrick Sutherland
Jean-Baptiste Moreau (clergyman)
John Creighton (judge)

References 

1773 deaths
Nova Scotia pre-Confederation MLAs
Year of birth uncertain
People of King George's War